Zakhele Lerato Lepasa (born 19 March 1997) is a South African professional soccer player who plays as a centre forward for South African Premier Division side Orlando Pirates and the South Africa national football team.

Club career
Born in Soweto, Lepasa started his career at Orlando Pirates. In August 2018, Lepasa joined Stellenbosch on a season-long loan. However, after 4 league appearances for Stellenbosch, he switched to TS Galaxy on loan in February 2019. He scored 9 goals in 15 matches for TS Galaxy in all competitions, including scoring the only goal of the 2019 Nedbank Cup Final against Kaizer Chiefs from the penalty spot, making TS Galaxy the first side from outside South Africa's top tier to win the competition. After 4 goals in 4 matches in the Nedbank Cup, he was awarded the 'Player of the Tournament' award as well as being the top scorer in the competition.

Lepasa made his debut for Orlando Pirates on 14 September 2019 as a substitute in a 2–1 win over Chippa United.

International career
Lepasa made his international debut on 2 June 2019 in a 2–2 draw with Botswana in the 2019 COSAFA Cup, with Lepasa scoring in the penalty shoot-out as South Africa lost 5–4.

References

External links

1997 births
Living people
South African soccer players
Sportspeople from Soweto
Association football forwards
Orlando Pirates F.C. players
Stellenbosch F.C. players
TS Galaxy F.C. players
South African Premier Division players
National First Division players
South Africa international soccer players